Malese Jow is an American actress and singer. She is known for her roles as Geena Fabiano on the Nickelodeon sitcom Unfabulous, Lucy Stone on the Nickelodeon musical sitcom Big Time Rush and as Anna, a teenage vampire on The CW's fantasy drama The Vampire Diaries. She starred as Julia Yeung in the short-lived CW science fiction romantic drama Star-Crossed. Jow starred as Mareth Ravenlock in season two of The Shannara Chronicles. She voiced Dupli-Kate in the Amazon Prime Video animated series Invincible.

Early life
Born in Tulsa, Oklahoma, Jow moved to California with her mother Lanae Tillery Jow, one sister, Makenna Jow, two brothers Jensen and Braden Jow when she was nine years old. Jow is mixed; she is European, Cherokee, and Chinese American. As a child, she would often sing the national anthem at local baseball games.

Career
When she was six years old, Jow appeared on Barney and Dellaventura, but her acting career took off when she won a co-starring role in the Nickelodeon sitcom Unfabulous with Emma Roberts where she played Geena Fabiano, one of the best friends of Roberts' character Addie Singer. The show ran for three seasons from 2004 to 2007 and earned Jow several Young Artist Award nominations.

When Unfabulous ended in 2007, Jow co-starred in the animated film Bratz: The Movie as Quinn and has guest-starred on the shows Wizards of Waverly Place, The Young and the Restless, iCarly, The Secret Life of the American Teenager and the Disney Channel series Hannah Montana and co-starred in the 2009 science fiction comedy Aliens in the Attic.

In 2010, Jow appeared in the first season of The CW fantasy drama The Vampire Diaries. She played Anna, a vampire. Jow briefly re-appeared in the third season. That same year, Jow co-starred in the fantasy romance film You're So Cupid! as Megan, and the drama film The Social Network as Alice Cantwell. She also guest-starred on an episode of TNT crime comedy-drama Leverage. Then she went on to star in the Nickelodeon action/science fiction sitcom The Troop as Cadence Nash.

In 2011, Jow began a recurring role in the second season of the Nickelodeon musical sitcom Big Time Rush as Lucy Stone, an aspiring rock musician and a brief love interest of Kendall Knight (Kendall Schmidt) and later on becomes the love interest of James Diamond (James Maslow). She guest-starred in the ABC mystery comedy-drama Desperate Housewives as Violet.

In 2012, Jow starred in The CW drama pilot Shelter, produced by J. J. Abrams and Mark Schwahn, where she played Morgan. It was not picked up by the network.

In January 2013, Jow confirmed her role in the crime comedy Plastic. That same month, it was also announced that Jow would reprise her role as Lucy Stone on Big Time Rush in the fourth and final season.

In February 2013, Jow was revealed to be the new host of The Vampire Diaries side show, TVD Rehash (Re#ash) replacing previous host Arielle Kebbel. Later that month, it was announced that Jow would be joining the CW science fiction romantic drama pilot Oxygen, as Julia Yeung, a girl who has an illness which may be cured by aliens. In May 2013, Oxygen was picked up and retitled Star-Crossed. The series was part of the 2013–14 mid season schedule. In August 2013, production began for Star-Crossed. The show ran for one season from February 17 to May 12, 2014. In 2014, Jow was in the television movie Presumed Dead in Paradise and played Madison Ashland. On October 27, 2014, she was announced to have a recurring role as Linda Park on the CW's superhero drama The Flash. In 2015, Malese was listed in Maxims Hot 10.  On August 25, 2015, Malese was announced to be reprising her role as Linda Park as a friend of Iris for multiple episodes. In the second season's fifth episode, "The Darkness and the Light," Malese played villainess Dr. Light, who is Earth 2 Linda Park. On February 2, 2017, it was announced Malese would be playing Mareth Ravenlock on MTV's The Shannara Chronicles. 
On NCIS: Los Angeles, she played Jennifer Kim, who is the illegitimate daughter of late NCIS Assistant Director Owen Granger (Miguel Ferrer). 
In September 2017, it was revealed that Malese would be playing Daya in the upcoming Escape Plan: The Extractors movie. Malese has begun filming a new feature film as of November 2017 titled I Wrote This For You.

Filmography

Film

Television

References

External links
 
 2007 Malese Jow interview, InsidePunk.com (archived)

Living people
20th-century American actresses
21st-century American actresses
21st-century American singers
American child actresses
American film actresses
American people of Chinese descent
American television actresses
Actresses from Tulsa, Oklahoma
Geffen Records artists
Year of birth missing (living people)